Singavaram is a village in Eluru district of the Indian state of Andhra Pradesh.

References 

Villages in Eluru district